Medak is a town in Telangana, India.

Medak may also refer to:

Places

Related to Medak, India
 Medak Fort
 Medak district 
 Medak mandal
 Medak Lok Sabha constituency
 Diocese of Medak of the Church of South India

Other places
 Medak, Croatia
 Medaković, colloquially Medak, an urban neighborhood of Belgrade, Serbia

People 
 Peter Medak (born Medák Péter, 1937), film director
 Marin Medak (born 1987), Slovenian adventurer

Other uses
 Ordnance Factory Medak, an Indian armoured vehicle manufacturer
 Medak gun, a 30mm automatic cannon